Matthew Edwards may refer to:

 Matthew Edwards (footballer) (1882–1944), English football player (Barnsley, Crystal Palace and Doncaster Rovers)
 Matthew Edwards, musician with The Music Lovers
 Matt Edwards (born 1970), music producer
 Matt Edwards (footballer) (born 1971), English football player (Reading, Brighton & Hove Albion)
 Matt Edwards (pool player) (born 1987), New Zealand pool player
 Matty Edwards (born 1991), English-born Scottish football player (Rochdale)
 Matthew Edwards (soccer) (born 2003), American soccer player for Atlanta United 2